, better known by his stage names  and , is a Japanese comedian, television personality and entertainer. Kosaka insists that Pikotaro is another personality promoted by him, but they are considered the same person. He is currently signed with Avex Management Inc. under Avex Group.

He is best known for his single  "PPAP (Pen-Pineapple-Apple-Pen)".

During US President Donald Trump's Fall 2017 trip to Asia, Kosaka was chosen to sing at the official state reception, reportedly due to Japanese Prime Minister Shinzō Abe's wish to keep the mood "upbeat".

Kosaka is also known for portraying Muryou Hakataminami in Mashin Sentai Kiramager (2020-2021).

Personal life 
Daimaou Kosaka married Hitomi Yasueda, a gravure model, on 3 August 2017. On 17 June 2018, Yasueda gave birth to their first daughter.

Discography

Albums

Studio albums

Singles

Other singles

Filmography 
Kosaka portrays Muruyo Hakataminami (The owner of Carat, Mentor to the Kiramagers, and Younger Brother to Kiramei Silver) on Mashin Sentai Kiramager. His role as Pikotaro (Most notably making PPAP) has been poked at many times, including (but not limited to):

 In the main base, a poster can be seen reading "Perfect Performance And Physical" in an Acrostic style.
 Episode 16's Pre-Credits scene has Juuru holding a pineapple and an apple, while asking whether Mixelan (the new mecha, and a cement mixer) can mix fruit. Hakataminami is standing next to him the whole time.
 In the Movie he performs the song in earnest in order to wake the team up during a fight with a dream themed monster

References

External links 
 

1973 births
20th-century Japanese people
21st-century Japanese people
Avex Group talents
Japanese male comedians
Living people
People from Aomori (city)